Luciano Daniel González Rizzoni (born 10 April 1997) is an Argentine rugby union player. He won gold at the 2019 Pan American Games in Lima, Peru. He was named in the Argentina squad for the Rugby sevens at the 2020 Summer Olympics.

In 2022, González competed for Argentina at the 2022 Rugby World Cup Sevens in Cape Town.

Notes

References

External links 
 
 
 
 

1997 births
Living people
Argentine rugby union players
Argentine rugby sevens players
Olympic rugby sevens players of Argentina
Rugby sevens players at the 2020 Summer Olympics
Pan American Games gold medalists for Argentina
Pan American Games medalists in rugby sevens
Rugby sevens players at the 2019 Pan American Games
Medalists at the 2019 Pan American Games
Sportspeople from La Rioja Province, Argentina
Olympic medalists in rugby sevens
Medalists at the 2020 Summer Olympics
Olympic bronze medalists for Argentina